Extremities may refer to:

Anatomy
 The distal limb (forearm or lower leg) of a tetrapod animal, more specifically its distalmost portion, including:
Hand, a prehensile, multi-digited organ at the distal end of upper limb (arm) of bipedal primates (especially humans) that is highly adapted for grasping and fine manipulation of objects
Foot, the terminal portion of a quadruped tetrapod's limb that mainly bears weight and allows terrestrial locomotion. In toe-walking ungulates, the term typically refers to the hoofed portion of the foot.
 Paw, a furry, padded foot with claws, common in many quadruped animals
 Appendage, any external body part that protrudes outwards from an organism's core, such as a limb, tail, ear, nose, horn/antler, external genitalia, antenna, tusk/mouthpart or raptorial

Other
 Extremities (play), a 1982 play by William Mastrosimone
 Extremities (film), a 1986 film based on the play

See also 
 Extreme (disambiguation)